South Korea does not recognize same-sex marriage, civil unions or any other form of legal union for same-sex couples.

Limited legal rights
In 2019, the Government of South Korea announced it would recognize the same-sex spouses of foreign diplomats who come to live in South Korea. The recognition does not extend to same-sex spouses of South Korean diplomats living abroad nor to South Korean same-sex couples. As of 2021, the only beneficiaries of this scheme have been the New Zealand ambassador, Phillip Turner, and his husband Hiroshi Ikeda. Turner and Ikeda attended an official reception with President Moon Jae-in and his wife Kim Jung-sook at the Blue House in October 2019 as "legal spouses". Kyudok Hong, a professor at Sookmyung Women's University, said that "[this] symbolically shows that the recognition of same-sex marriage is a global trend and that Korea cannot ignore it."

In February 2020, a man in a same-sex relationship successfully registered his partner, So Seong-wook, as his spouse, allowing So to access his employer's health insurance plan. When the story became public a few months later, the National Health Insurance Service (NHIS) reversed course and revoked the dependent status. In February 2021, So filed a lawsuit against the NHIS. He claimed that the NHIS had unfairly discriminated against the couple as the agency provides spousal coverage to common-law partners, and only canceled his coverage under the insurance program of his partner's employer after learning of his same-sex marriage. In January 2022, an administrative court ruled against him citing the lack of legal recognition of same-sex unions in South Korea. So said he would appeal, "We will appeal, and the world will change. I believe a world in which people can live equally is coming soon." The appellate court ruled in favor of the couple on 21 February 2023, holding that government health insurance should offer spousal coverage to same-sex couples, the "first legal recognition of social benefits for same-sex couples" in South Korea.

Civil partnerships
In October 2014, a bill to legalize life partnerships was proposed by some members of the Democratic Party of Korea. Life partnerships would have been open to both opposite-sex and same-sex couples, and offered some of the rights and benefits of marriage, such as tax benefits, protection from domestic violence, etc. However, the bill was not brought to a vote in the National Assembly.

In February 2021, the government announced plans to recognise domestic partnerships for opposite-sex couples in light of the country's falling birthrate, which is attributed to the cost of raising children and education. The reform would not apply to same-sex couples; "There hasn't been any discussion nor even a consideration about same-sex couples", a government spokesperson said. Human Rights Watch urged the government to recognise same-sex domestic partnerships.

Same-sex marriage

Legal challenges

On July 30, 2004, the Sexual Minorities Committee filed a formal complaint with the Incheon District Court against the government's refusal to recognize same-sex marriages. The complaint was filed on the grounds that the decision was unconstitutional since neither the Constitution of South Korea nor civil law defined marriage as being between a man and a woman (the only mentioned requisite was the age of majority) and that the Constitution explicitly prohibited discrimination "pertaining to all political, economic, social, or cultural aspects of life of an individual". The Committee also claimed that refusal to recognize same-sex marriages constituted discrimination based on sexual orientation and a refusal to provide equal protection under the law. The complaint was ultimately rejected.

In July 2015, Kim-Jho Gwangsoo and his partner Kim Seung-Hwan filed a lawsuit seeking legal status for their marriage, after their marriage registration form was rejected by local authorities in Seoul. The couple held a wedding ceremony in September 2013. On 25 May 2016, the Seoul Western District Court ruled against the couple, arguing that without clear legislation a same-sex union could not be recognized as a marriage. The couple quickly appealed the court ruling. Their lawyer, Ryu Min-Hee, announced that two more same-sex couples had filed separate lawsuits to be allowed to marry. On 5 December 2016, an appellate court upheld the district court's ruling.

In February 2019, the National Human Rights Commission of Korea rejected a petition filed by a British-South Korean same-sex couple who had married in the United Kingdom and sought to have their marriage recognized in South Korea. The commission stated that without legislative action or a judicial decision it was not permitted under law to recognise a foreign same-sex marriage.

Political viewpoints

Support
The Democratic Labor Party, established in January 2000, was a major political party in South Korea and had a political panel known as the Sexual Minorities Committee which advocated for the recognition and political representation of sexual minorities. Their stated agenda included a campaign against homophobia and discrimination based on sexual orientation, equal rights for sexual minorities (in their own words, "complete freedom, equality, and right of pursuit of happiness for homosexuals"), as well as the legalization of same-sex marriages. In its campaign bid for the 2004 parliamentary elections, the Democratic Labor Party promised the abolition of all inequalities against sexual minorities and won a record 10 seats in the National Assembly. The party later merged with the Unified Progressive Party in 2011, which was banned in 2014 on charges of plotting a pro-North Korea rebellion.

The Justice Party and the Green Party have expressed support for LGBT rights and legal recognition of same-sex unions. Some members of the Democratic Party of Korea (DPK) have also voiced support. In an interview held in September 2014 and later published in October, the Mayor of Seoul, Park Won-soon, announced his support for same-sex marriage, saying he hoped South Korea would become the first country in Asia to legalize same-sex marriage. A few days later, the Seoul Metropolitan Government announced that his words had been "misinterpreted" and that Park's words were that "maybe South Korea would become the first country in Asia to legalize same-sex marriage". This followed severe and violent backlash from conservative Christian groups.

During the 2017 presidential election, only one of the 14 presidential candidates, the Justice Party's Sim Sang-jung, voiced clear support for LGBT rights.

Opposition
The People Power Party is opposed to LGBT rights and same-sex marriage. President Moon Jae-in of the Democratic Party of Korea, in office between 2017 and 2022, was opposed to same-sex marriage.

On December 19, 2007, Lee Myung-bak of the conservative Grand National Party won the presidential election. In a 2007 newspaper interview, Lee stated that homosexuality was "abnormal", and that he opposed the legal recognition of same-sex marriages.

Public opinion
An April 2013 Gallup poll revealed that 25% of South Koreans supported same-sex marriage, while 67% opposed it and 8% did not know or refused to answer. A May 2013 Ipsos poll found that 26% of respondents were in favour of same-sex marriage and another 31% supported other forms of recognition for same-sex couples.

The matchmaking website Duo asked 616 people between 25 July and 1 August 2015 for their views on same-sex marriage. Nearly 70% of female respondents viewed same-sex marriage as "acceptable", while 50% of men were against legalizing same-sex marriage. The majority of respondents who supported same-sex marriage said they did so because marriage was a personal choice (68%), 14% said sexual orientation was determined by nature and 12% said it would help end discrimination.

A 2017 Gallup Korea poll found that 58% of South Koreans opposed legalising same-sex marriage, while 34% supported and 8% were undecided. Another survey in December 2017 conducted by Gallup for MBC and the Speaker of the National Assembly reported that 41% of South Koreans thought same-sex marriage should be allowed, while 53% were against.

Public support for same-sex marriage is growing rapidly according to the Asan Institute for Policy Studies. In 2010, 31% and 21% of South Koreans in their 20s and 30s, respectively, supported the legalization of same-sex marriages. In 2014, these numbers had almost doubled to 60% and 40%. Support among people over 60, however, remained unchanged (14% to 15%).

See also
 LGBT rights in South Korea
 Recognition of same-sex unions in Asia
 Same-sex union court cases

References

Law of South Korea
Politics of South Korea
South Korea
marriage
Marriage, unions and partnerships in South Korea